The Taylor-Falls House is a historic house in Como, Mississippi, in the United States.  It was designed and built by Swedish-American architect Andrew Johnson in 1885. The house was listed on the National Register of Historic Places in 1984.

Architecture 
This house is a single story, "gable-roofed, picturesquely massed and irregularly fenestrated frame house."

References

Houses on the National Register of Historic Places in Mississippi
Houses in Panola County, Mississippi
National Register of Historic Places in Panola County, Mississippi